The phrase "Nazi concentration camp" is often used loosely to refer to various types of internment sites operated by Nazi Germany. More specifically, Nazi concentration camps refers to the camps run by the Concentration Camps Inspectorate and later the SS Main Economic and Administrative Office. The Nazi regime employed various types of detention and murder facilities within Germany and the territories it conquered, while Nazi allies also operated their own internment facilities on their territories.

The editors of Encyclopedia of Camps and Ghettos estimate that these sites totaled more than 42,500 locations, of which 980 were Nazi concentration camps proper.

Nazi Germany
Types of detention and murder facilities employed by the Nazi regime included:

Nazi Allies
Nazi allies also operated their own internment facilities, including:
Internment camps in Bulgaria
Concentration camps in the Independent State of Croatia
Internment camps in Finland
Internment camps in France
Internment camps in French North Africa
Internment camps in Hungary
Internment camps of Italy
Concentration camps in Norway
Internment camps of Romania
Internment camps in the Slovak State
Internment camps in Tunisia

See also
 List of Nazi extermination camps and euthanasia centers
 List of Nazi concentration camps

References

World War II internment camps